The 1957 New Zealand general election was a nationwide vote to determine the shape of the New Zealand Parliament's 32nd term. It saw the governing National Party narrowly defeated by the Labour Party. The 1957 elections marked the beginning of the second Labour government, although this administration was to last only a single term.

Background
The National Party had formed its first administration after the 1949 elections, and had been re-elected in the 1951 elections and the 1954 elections. As its third term in office continued, however, the Prime Minister, Sidney Holland, became increasingly ill. Holland's memory began to fail, and he is believed to have suffered a mild heart attack during the Suez Crisis. A mere two months before the 1957 election, Holland was persuaded by his party to step down; Keith Holyoake, his deputy, became Prime Minister. The Labour Party was still led by Walter Nash, who had been Finance Minister in the first Labour government.

The 1957 election campaign was dominated largely by financial issues, particularly introduction of the PAYE tax system. As a campaign promise, Labour announced that in the year that PAYE commenced, there would be a flat rebate of £100 on income tax — National attacked this as an election bribe. Labour also campaigned to abolish compulsory military training. National made no great changes to its policy platform, and Holyoake largely retained the Cabinet he had inherited from his predecessor.

MPs retiring in 1957
Six National MPs intended to retire at the end of the 31st Parliament. No Labour MPs retired.

Jack Massey also left parliament at the election. He intended to stand again in  but was deselected as a candidate by the National Party.

The election
The date for the main 1957 election was 30 November. 1,252,329 people were registered to vote, and turnout was 92.9%. This turnout, although only average for the time, was not to be equalled or exceeded until the 1984 election. The number of seats being contested was 80, a number which had been fixed since 1902.

The Labour candidate for Clutha, Bruce Waters, died the day before the general election, and the election there was postponed to 18 January 1958.

Election results

Party standings
The 1957 election saw the governing National Party defeated by a narrow two-seat margin. It had previously held a ten-seat majority. National won a total of thirty-nine seats, while the Labour Party won forty-one. In the popular vote, National won 44% to Labour's 48%. The Social Credit Party won 7% of the vote, a drop from its previous result of 11%. It still won no seats.

Votes summary

The table below shows the results of the 1957 general election:

Key

|-
 |colspan=8 style="background-color:#FFDEAD" | General electorates
|-

|-
 | Hauraki
 | style="background-color:;" |
 | colspan=3 style="text-align:center;background-color:;" | Arthur Kinsella
 | style="text-align:right;" | 1,161
 | style="background-color:;" |
 | style="text-align:center;" | Brevat William Dynes
|-

|-
 |colspan=8 style="background-color:#FFDEAD" | Māori electorates
|-

|}
Table footnotes:

Post-election events
A number of local by-elections were required due to the resignations of incumbent local body politicians following the general election:

 There were two by-elections for the Christchurch City Council. Councillors Mabel Howard and John Mathison also resigned their seats following their election as cabinet ministers at the formation of the Second Labour government causing a by-election to replace them on the council. Likewise Robert Macfarlane resigned as Mayor of Christchurch upon his selection as Speaker of the New Zealand House of Representatives. Macfarlane was succeeded as mayor by councillor George Manning. McFarlane was elected for one of the vacant seats on the council, with the other seats being won by Bill Glue, Bill MacGibbon and Peter Skellerup.

Notes

References

 
November 1957 events in New Zealand